South African Sportsperson of the Year are annual sporting awards given to best South African athletes.

List of Winners

References

External links
List of winners

National sportsperson-of-the-year trophies and awards
South African sports trophies and awards